Compsibidion is a genus of beetles in the family Cerambycidae, containing the following species:

 Compsibidion aegrotum (Bates, 1870)
 Compsibidion amantei (Martins, 1960)
 Compsibidion angulare (Thomson, 1867)
 Compsibidion balium Napp & Martins, 1985
 Compsibidion basale (White, 1855)
 Compsibidion callispilum (Bates, 1870)
 Compsibidion campestre (Gounelle, 1909)
 Compsibidion capixaba (Martins, 1962)
 Compsibidion carenatum Martins, 1969
 Compsibidion charile (Bates, 1870)
 Compsibidion circunflexum Martins, 1971
 Compsibidion cleophile (Thomson, 1865)
 Compsibidion clivum Martins, 1971
 Compsibidion concisum Napp & Martins, 1985
 Compsibidion crassipede Martins, 1971
 Compsibidion decemmaculatum (Martins, 1960)
 Compsibidion decoratum (Gounelle, 1909)
 Compsibidion derivativum Martins, 1971
 Compsibidion divisum Martins, 1969
 Compsibidion fairmairei (Thomson, 1865)
 Compsibidion graphicum (Thomson, 1867)
 Compsibidion guanabarinum (Martins, 1962)
 Compsibidion ilium (Thomson, 1864)
 Compsibidion inornatum (Martins, 1962)
 Compsibidion litturatum (Martins, 1960)
 Compsibidion maculatum Martins, Galileo & Oliveira, 2011
 Compsibidion maronicum (Thomson, 1867)
 Compsibidion megarthron (Martins, 1962)
 Compsibidion melancholicum Martins, 1969
 Compsibidion meridionale Martins, 1969
 Compsibidion monnei Martins, 1969
 Compsibidion multizonatum Martins, 1969
 Compsibidion muricatum Martins, 1971
 Compsibidion mysticum Martins, 1969
 Compsibidion nigroterminatum (Martins, 1965)
 Compsibidion niveum (Martins, 1962)
 Compsibidion omissum Martins, 1969
 Compsibidion orpa (White, 1855)
 Compsibidion paradoxum Martins, 1971
 Compsibidion paulista (Martins, 1962)
 Compsibidion polyzonum (Bates, 1870)
 Compsibidion psydrum Martins, 1969
 Compsibidion pumilium Martins & Galileo, 1999
 Compsibidion punga Martins & Galileo, 2007
 Compsibidion quadrisignatum (Thomson, 1865)
 Compsibidion reichardti (Martins, 1962)
 Compsibidion rutha (White, 1855)
 Compsibidion simillimum Martins, 1969
 Compsibidion singulare (Gounelle, 1909)
 Compsibidion sommeri (Thomson, 1865)
 Compsibidion sphaeriinum (Bates, 1870)
 Compsibidion taperu Martins & Galileo, 2007
 Compsibidion tethys (Thomson, 1867)
 Compsibidion thoracicum (White, 1855)
 Compsibidion trichocerum (Martins, 1962)
 Compsibidion trinidadense (Gilmour, 1963)
 Compsibidion triviale Napp & Martins, 1985
 Compsibidion truncatum (Thomson, 1865)
 Compsibidion tuberosum Martins, 1971
 Compsibidion unifasciatum (Gounelle, 1909)
 Compsibidion uniforme Galileo & Martins, 2011
 Compsibidion vanum (Thomson, 1867)
 Compsibidion varipenne Martins, 1969
 Compsibidion virgatum Martins, 1969
 Compsibidion ytu Martins, Galileo & Oliveira, 2011
 Compsibidion zikani (Melzer, 1933)

References

 
Neoibidionini